Erika Forster-Vannini (née Vannini; born 27 February 1944) is a Swiss businesswoman and former politician. She served as a member on the Council of States (Switzerland) for The Liberals from 1995 to 2011, which she presided from 2009 to 2010. Between 1988 and 1996 she served on the Grand Council of St. Gallen, which she presided in 1994/1995.

Early life and education 
Forster was born 27 February 1944 in Zürich, Switzerland, a daughter of Hans 'Jean' (1902-2005) and Emilie Vannini. She has two sisters. She completed her Matura in Zürich and then completed several exchanges abroad.

Her father operated a construction/paining company in the second generation. Jean Vannini was primarily known for his activities in the creation of subsidized housing together with Ernst Göhner. They founded several wood manufacturing companies and built over 4,000 apartments primarily in the region of Zürich. Through his membership on the municipal council of Zürich, he befriended and allied with Gottlieb Duttweiler, founder of  Migros. The Vannini family originally hailed from Villa Luganese in Ticino, Switzerland, where they originated since the 15th century. Her great-grandfather, a famous sculptor, settled in Hottingen (Zürich) and took municipal citizenship there in 1870.

Career 
After her stays abroad, she completed flight attendant training, and worked four years at Swissair. 

She held many other offices, including President of the Foundation for the Protection of the Swiss Landscape, Member of the Board of the Association of Private Limited Companies, Member of the Board of the Minergie Association, President of the Foundation for Psychiatric Services for Young People in the Canton of St. Gallen, President of the Supervisory Board of the Institute for Management and Human Resources Management at the University of St. Gallen, and President of the Board of Directors of ERSIAN, Zürich.

Politics 
Mrs Forster-Vannini's political career began in 1977 when she was elected to the St. Gallen City Council.  She served as President of that body in 1982 and remained a member until 1988, when she became a member of the St. Gallen Cantonal Council.  She served as President of the Cantonal Council in 1994-5, after which she was elected to the Council of States. She was a member of the Council of States from 1995 to 2011.

She has been outspoken about maternity health issues, passive smoking and internet addiction.

Personal life 
She met her husband, Ueli Forster (b. 1939), in the early 1970s. He hailed from a textile manufacturing family of St. Gallen, who owned Forster Rohner AG. Her husband is Ueli Forster and she has four children and four grandchildren. They reside in St. Gallen.

References

External links 

 Official website

1944 births
Living people
Members of the Council of States (Switzerland)
Presidents of the Council of States (Switzerland)
Politicians from Zürich
Women members of the Council of States (Switzerland)
Free Democratic Party of Switzerland politicians
20th-century Swiss women politicians
20th-century Swiss politicians
21st-century Swiss women politicians
21st-century Swiss politicians